Ýolöten District   is a district of Mary Province in Turkmenistan. The administrative center of the district is the town of Ýolöten.

History
Formed in January 1926 as Iolotan Raion, its location is in Merv District of the Turkmen Soviet Socialist Republic. In July the same year, Merv District is abolished, and as a result Iolotan became directly subordinate to the Turkmen SSR. 

In November 1939, Iolotan is included into Mary Oblast. However, in 1963, Mary is also abolished, and Iolotan is once again subordinate to the Turkmen SSR.

In December 1970, Iolotan rejoins the restored Mary Oblast that was previously abolished in 1963. In 1992, Iolotan was renamed into its current name Ýolöten and became part of Mary Province.

districts of Turkmenistan
Mary Region